Funda Nakkaşoğlu (born 22 September 1995) is an Australian-Turkish basketball player.

College
Nakkaşoğlu began her college career at Utah State University in Logan, Utah for the Aggies. After two seasons with the Aggies, Nakkaşoğlu transferred to the University of Florida in Gainesville, Florida where she would now play for the Gators for the remaining two years of her playing eligibility. She finished her collegiate career with 2,047 points (1,149 with Utah State and 898 with University of Florida).

Career

WNBL
Nakkaşoğlu began her career signing on an amateur contract with the Bulleen Boomers for the 2012–13 season.

In 2020, Nakkaşoğlu signed with the Sydney Uni Flames for the 2020–21 season. This marks her first time playing in Australia & the WNBL since 2013.

Turkey
Nakkaşoğlu will begin her professional career in the Turkish Super League after signing with Galatasaray S.K. She will be playing alongside the likes of Işıl Alben and Victoria Macaulay.

National team

Senior Level
At the age of 20, Nakkaşoğlu was invited to attend Turkey's national team camp ahead of their Olympic campaign. Despite growing up and playing in Australia, Nakkaşoğlu was eligible for the team given her dual passports due to her parents Turkish background. Nakkaşoğlu was not named to the final roster however has continued to hold a place in the Turkish squad.

References

1995 births
Living people
Australian people of Turkish descent
Turkish women's basketball players
Australian women's basketball players
Turkish expatriate basketball people in the United States
Australian expatriate basketball people in the United States
Guards (basketball)
Florida Gators women's basketball players